Myas baehri is a species of ground beetle in the subfamily Pterostichinae. It was described by Kirschenhofer in 2007.

References

Lesticus
Beetles described in 2007